Public Dreams Society was a non-profit organization and registered charity to celebrate and strengthen community spirit in Vancouver.  It was founded in 1985 by Dolly Hopkins, Paula Jardine and Lesley Fiddler. It promoted creative expression, turning passive consumption into active participation, and the experience of belonging within a community.

Its stated mission was to:
 Create artistically, innovative, culturally inclusive and environmentally sensitive productions
 Encourage creative collaborations and build fellowship among diverse communities
 Foster the fertile ground necessary to create and enhance community vitality
 Provide economic opportunities for local artists, communities and businesses

Its most notable community events included:
 Illuminares Lantern Procession (1989–2013)
 Parade of Lost Souls (1994–)
 Mountain Mardi Gras (2006)
 Circus of Dreams (1997–2004)

The Society disbanded in 2013, issuing the following message:
Goodnight and Good Luck, Vancouver!
For over 25 years, Public Dreams has been a forerunner in Vancouver’s cultural landscape, creating inspired original frameworks for the community to gather and share unforgettable creative experiences. As 2013 draws to a end, Public Dreams also joyfully announces its closure and takes a much needed rest knowing it achieved what it set out to do—connect communities through creativity.
With this closure the current society membership and board sends endless gratitude to all who have helped it during its long life as one of Vancouver’s leading arts charities: founders, board members, artistic directors, producers, administrators, volunteers and more. Additionally, a very special thank you goes out to the people of Vancouver, for participating in all of the events Public Dreams has produced. The community’s involvement was the true magic and heart of the organization. And don’t fear—the legacy of Public Dreams will continue, with their two flagship signature events, Illuminares and Parade of Lost Souls being stewarded to other like-minded and very capable organizations. Watch for news of these in the coming months, we trust that the public will continue to support Illuminares and Parade of Lost Souls for years to come.
With love and great thanks!

External links 
 Archived copy of Public Dreams Society 
 Parade of the Lost Souls Flickr Photo Pool

Culture of Vancouver
Organizations based in Vancouver